King Neptune (subtitled Dexter in Radioland Vol. 3) is a live album by American saxophonist Dexter Gordon recorded at the Jazzhus Montmartre in Copenhagen, Denmark in 1964 by Danmarks Radio and released on the SteepleChase label in 1979.

Critical reception 

AllMusic critic Scott Yanow stated "All of the releases in this valuable Dexter in Radioland series are recommended".

Track listing 
All compositions by Dexter Gordon except where noted.

 Introduction by Dexter Gordon – 1:21
 "King Neptune" – 12:23
 "Satin Doll" (Duke Ellington, Billy Strayhorn, Johnny Mercer) – 12:29
 "Body and Soul" (Johnny Green, Frank Eyton, Edward Heyman, Robert Sour) – 10:05
 "I Want to Blow Now" (Bennie Green) – 14:39

Source:

Personnel 
Dexter Gordon – tenor saxophone, vocals
Tete Montoliu – piano
Benny Nielsen – bass
Alex Riel – drums

Source:

References 

SteepleChase Records live albums
Dexter Gordon live albums
1979 live albums
Albums recorded at Jazzhus Montmartre